The Statute Law Revision (Scotland) Act 1964 (c.80) was an Act of the Parliament of the United Kingdom of Great Britain and Northern Ireland.

It was prepared by the Statute Law Committee. It further revised the Pre-Union Acts of the Parliament of Scotland which had previously revised by the Statute Law Revision (Scotland) Act 1906. Its purpose was to repeal obsolete enactments, to take into account changes in the law, and to facilitate the indexing of those Acts in the Chronological Table of the Statutes and the Index to the Statutes.

The Bill that became this Act was introduced into the House of Lords.

Provisions
Section 1 - Repeals of Acts

This section repealed a number of Pre-Union Acts of the Parliament of Scotland, which were declared to be obsolete, spent or unnecessary, or to have been superseded by other enactments, either in full or in part. Those Acts were listed in Schedule 1.

This section and Schedule 1 were repealed by section 1 of, and Part XI of the Schedule to, the Statute Law (Repeals) Act 1974.

The repeal of this section and Schedule 1 did not revive the Acts that they repealed.

Section 2 - Citation of Acts

This section conferred short titles on the 164 Pre-Union Acts of the Parliament of Scotland which were not repealed by section 1. The short titles were listed in Schedule 2.
It was expressly provided that those Acts could be cited by those short titles "without prejudice to any other mode of citation".

Those Acts may continue to be cited by those short titles notwithstanding the repeal of this section and Schedule 2.

Section 3 - Construction of Schedules

This section provided that (the citation of the Acts in) the Schedules were to be construed as referring to the Revised Edition of the Acts of the Parliament of Scotland, prepared by the Statute Law Committee, printed in 1908.

Section 4

This section provided the Act's short title.

See also
Statute Law Revision Act

References
Partial text of the Act (as reproduced in House of Lords Committee for Privileges, 2nd report of Session 1998–99, Proceedings of the Committee (HL 108-I), Appendix 4(16))
John Burke (editor), Current Law Statutes Annotated 1964, Sweet and Maxwell
Hansard (House of Lords), 25 June 1964, vol. 259, col. 320
Hansard (House of Lords), 2 July 1964, vol. 259, col. 715
Hansard (House of Lords), 8 July 1964, vol. 259, col. 1086
Hansard (House of Lords), 20 July 1964, vol. 260, col. 452
Hansard (House of Commons), 22 July 1964, vol. 699, col. 625 - 639
Hansard (House of Commons), 24 July 1964, vol. 699, col. 934
Hansard (House of Commons), 24 July 1964, vol. 699, col. 934 - 946
Hansard (House of Lords), 27 July 1964, vol. 260, col. 960
Hansard (House of Commons), 31 July 1964, vol. 699, col. 1948 - 50 (royal assent)
(1965) 16 Northern Ireland Legal Quarterly 168 (No 1)
Stanley Scott Robinson. The Law of Game, Salmon & Freshwater Fishing in Scotland. Butterworths. 1990. Page 5.
"Ane End of Ane Old Song" (1965) 84 Law Notes 210 (No 9)
"England Repeals the American Colonies Act of 1766" (1965) 17 Stanford Law Review 1178 et seq (No 6, July 1965)
Reid and Zimmermann (eds). A History of Private Law in Scotland. Oxford University Press. 2000. Volume 2. Page 502.
Colin Turpin and Adam Tomkins. British Government and the Constitution: Text and Materials. Sixth Edition. Cambridge University Press. 2007. Page 201.
124 International Law Reports 580, 583, 595 and 596
Robery Megarry. A New Miscellany-at-Law. Bryan A Garner (ed). Hart Publishing. Lawbook Exchange. 2005. Page 56.

External links

United Kingdom Acts of Parliament 1964
1964 in law
Acts of the Parliament of the United Kingdom concerning Scotland
1964 in Scotland
Scots law